|}

The Anglesey Stakes is a Group 3 flat horse race in Ireland open to two-year-old thoroughbreds. It is run at the Curragh over a distance of 6 furlongs and 63 yards (1,265 metres), and it is scheduled to take place each year in July.

History
The event was established in 1829, and it was originally contested over 6 furlongs. It was extended by 63 yards in 1897. The race became known as the Anglesey Plate in 1948. It reverted to the title Anglesey Stakes in 1958. It was given Group 3 status in 1971.

The Anglesey Stakes was formerly held in late August or early September. It was switched to July in 1997. It is currently staged during the Irish Oaks meeting.

Records

Leading jockey since 1960 (5 wins):
 Michael Kinane – Keraka (1993), Rossini (1999), Johannesburg (2001), Ontario (2002), One Cool Cat (2003)

Leading trainer since 1960 (13 wins):
 Vincent O'Brien – Philemon (1962), Bravery (1965), Nijinsky (1969), Headlamp (1970), Roberto (1971), Saritamer (1973), Niebo (1975), Solinus (1977), Storm Bird (1980), Caerleon (1982), Law Society (1984), Woodman (1985), Lake Como (1987)

Winners since 1976

Earlier winners

 1829: Regulator
 1830: Philip the First
 1831: Kildare
 1832: New Fashion
 1833: Whitefoot
 1834: Whim
 1835: Wedge
 1836: Magpie
 1837: Permit
 1838: Wirrestrew
 1839: Johnny
 1840: Wheel
 1841: Ballinkeele
 1842: Condor
 1843: Loadstone
 1844: Pickpocket
 1845: Mermaid
 1846: Horn of Chase
 1847: Justice to Ireland
 1848: Chatterer
 1849: Queen Margaret
 1850: The Marquis
 1851: Indian Warrior
 1852: The Deformed
 1853: Tom
 1854: Cockatoo
 1855: Citron
 1856: Queencake
 1857: Zaidee
 1858: Fingal
 1859: Busy Bee
 1860: Bombardier
 1861: Troublesome
 1862: Roman Bee
 1863: Blarney
 1864: It's Curious
 1865: Owen Roe
 1866: Dora
 1867: Uncas
 1868: Melody
 1869: Adeline
 1870: Amnesty
 1871: Shelmartin
 1872: Queen of the Bees
 1873: Lady Patricia
 1874: Wild Duck
 1875: Princess Bon Bon
 1876: Second Sight
 1877: Cimaroon
 1878: Soulouque
 1879: Sibyl
 1880: Master Ned
 1881: The Jilt
 1882: Donnycarney
 1883: Melianthus
 1884: Magic
 1885: Mellifont
 1886: Kildare
 1887: Philomel
 1888: St Kieran
 1889: Killowen
 1890: The Rhymer
 1891: Christabel
 1892: Loot
 1893: Delphos
 1894: Instability
 1895: Rinvanny
 1896: Diabolo
 1897: Sirenia
 1898: Eulogy
 1899: Steinort
 1900: Corncrake
 1901: Meldhre
 1902: Fariman
 1903: Jean's Folly
 1904: Cherry Lass
 1905: Merry Moment
 1906: Knight of Tully
 1907: Temeraire
 1908: Roland Lee
 1909: Trepida
 1910: Velociter
 1911: Amsterdam
 1912: Laoghaire
 1913: Mellifont
 1914: no race
 1915: Ayn Hali
 1916: General Villa
 1917: Elfterion
 1918: Grand Parade
 1919: Tenroh
 1920: Russian Sable
 1921: Vesta
 1922: French Briar
 1923: Artoy
 1924: White Spot
 1925: Ardsallagh
 1926: Polecat
 1927: Athford
 1928: Trigo
 1929: Ballyferis
 1930: Soliped
 1931: Centeno
 1932: Black Wings
 1933: Starford
 1934: Smokeless
 1935: Grangemore
 1936: Owenstown
 1937: On Edge
 1938: Rose of Portugal
 1939: Eyrefield
 1940: Rose Garland
 1941: Terrible Times
 1942: Up Hill
 1943: Arctic Sun
 1944: Mafosta
 1945: Silver Thistle
 1946: Grand Weather
 1947: The Web
 1948: Ballywillwill
 1949: First View
 1950: Clare Hill
 1951: Engulfed
 1952: Blue Label
 1953: Sixpence
 1954: Flying Story
 1955: Dumpty Humpty
 1956: No Complaint
 1957: Daffodil
 1958: Sauchrie
 1959: Arctic Sea
 1960: Indian Conquest
 1961: Richmond
 1962: Philemon
 1963: Dromoland
 1964: Green Banner
 1965: Bravery
 1966: Archangel Gabriel
 1967: Society
 1968: Marcia Royal
 1969: Nijinsky
 1970: Headlamp
 1971: Roberto
 1972: Tekoah
 1973: Saritamer
 1974: Mark Anthony
 1975: Niebo

See also
 Horse racing in Ireland
 List of Irish flat horse races

References
 Paris-Turf:
 Racing Post:

 galopp-sieger.de – Anglesey Stakes.
 ifhaonline.org – International Federation of Horseracing Authorities – Anglesey Stakes (2019).
 irishracinggreats.com – Anglesey Stakes (Group 3).
 pedigreequery.com – Anglesey Stakes – Curragh.
 tbheritage.com – Anglesey Stakes.

Flat races in Ireland
Curragh Racecourse
Flat horse races for two-year-olds
Recurring sporting events established in 1829
1829 establishments in Ireland